Silkeborg municipality is a municipality (Danish, kommune) in Region Midtjylland on the Jutland peninsula in central Denmark.  The municipality covers an area of 857.16 km², and has a population of 97,358 (1. January 2022).  Its mayor is Steen Vindum, of the party Venstre. The main town and the site of its municipal council is the town of Silkeborg.

On 1 January 2007 Silkeborg municipality was, as the result of Kommunalreformen ("The Municipal Reform" of 2007), merged with Gjern, Kjellerup, and Them municipalities to form the new Silkeborg municipality.

The municipality is part of Business Region Aarhus and of the East Jutland metropolitan area, which had a total population of 1.378 million in 2016.

Locations

The town of Silkeborg 

The town is of Silkeborg is divided north and south by the lake, Silkeborg Langsø, which at the eastern side of the town, resolves into the Guden River (Gudenaa).  Silkeborg was the home town of COBRA painter Asger Jorn, and has several interesting art museums and exhibitions, including Museum Jorn, Silkeborg with its large Asger Jorn collection.

Politics

Municipal council
Silkeborg's municipal council consists of 31 members, elected every four years.

Below are the municipal councils elected since the Municipal Reform of 2007.

References

Sources 
 Municipal statistics: NetBorger Kommunefakta, delivered from KMD aka Kommunedata (Municipal Data)
 Municipal mergers and neighbors: Eniro new municipalities map
 Searchable/printable municipality maps

External links 

 
 silkeborg.com - HOME:(English site)
 Museum Jorn, Silkeborg

 
Municipalities of the Central Denmark Region
Municipalities of Denmark
Populated places established in 2007